María Auxiliadora is the Spanish language translation of Mary, Help of Christians. In Portuguese it is spelled Maria, without the diacritic.

It may also refer to:

Geographic regions 
María Auxiliadora, Distrito Nacional a sector in the city of Santo Domingo in the Dominican Republic
María Auxiliadora, Guanajuato, a town near the municipality of San Felipe, Guanajuato, Mexico

Parishes 
María Auxiliadora, Colón, Montevideo, a Roman Catholic parish church in Colón, Montevideo, Uruguay
María Auxiliadora, Montevideo, a Roman Catholic parish church in Parque Rodó, Montevideo, Uruguay

People 
 Maria Auxiliadora (artist), a Brazilian self-taught painter.